The Niagara River Greenway Plan is a comprehensive plan focusing on the development of a greenway of interconnected parks, river access points and waterfront trails along the right bank of the Niagara River from Lake Ontario to Lake Erie. The plan was drawn up by The Niagara River Greenway Commission, first established in 2004 by then New York state Governor George Pataki.

Location of The Greenway
The Greenway is defined by Municipal boundaries.  Currently 13 Towns, Villages, Cities and Municipalities are located within the Greenway.  Upon completion the Greenway will encompass approximately 35 miles (north to south) of greenspace.

Included Municipalities 

Porter, New York                                        
Youngstown, New York
Village of Lewiston, New York
Town of Lewiston, New York
Niagara, New York
Niagara Falls, New York
Wheatfield, New York
North Tonawanda, New York
Town of Tonawanda, New York
City of Tonawanda, New York
Grand Island, New York
Kenmore, New York
Buffalo, New York

References

External links
Governor Signs Bill Creating Niagara River Greenway Commission
Niagara River Greenway Commission
New York State Department of Environmental Conservation

Parks in New York (state)
Urban public parks